We the People is the third studio album by American heavy metal band Adrenaline Mob. It was released on June 2, 2017, and was followed by a tour. According to lead vocalist Russell Allen, the album takes a political stance. He also stated that he was inspired by the previous American election season.

It is the band's only album with bass guitarist David Zablidowsky, as he would die in a traffic accident while touring with them later that year. Former band drummer A. J. Pero, who died in 2015, is featured on a cover of the Billy Idol song "Rebel Yell" (new drummer Jordan Cannata performs on all the other tracks). This makes We the People the final work of both Pero and Zablidowsky.

Track listing

Personnel
Adrenaline Mob
 Russell Allen – vocals, production
 Mike Orlando – guitars, backing vocals
 David Zablidowsky – bass
 Jordan Cannata – drums
 A. J. Pero - drums on "Rebel Yell"

Charts

References

2017 albums
Adrenaline Mob albums
Century Media Records albums